The 1994–95 Arizona Wildcats men's basketball team represented the University of Arizona. The team's head coach was Lute Olson. The team played its home games in McKale Center as members of the Pacific-10 Conference.

After going 14–4 to finish second in the Pac-10 regular-season, the team was seeded 5th in the Midwest region of the NCAA tournament.  They were upset in the opening round by 12 seed Miami (OH), 71–62.  The team finished with a record of 24–7.

Roster

Schedule and results

|-
!colspan=9| Regular Season

|-
!colspan=9| NCAA tournament

Rankings

NBA draft

References

Arizona
Arizona
Arizona Wildcats men's basketball seasons
Arizona Wildcats
Arizona Wildcats